The  is a tributary of the Kiso River located in Gifu and Mie Prefectures in Japan. Along with the Nagara and Kiso rivers, the Ibi is the third of the Kiso Three Rivers of the Nōbi Plain. It is one of Japan's first-class rivers. The former Tōkaidō post station of Kuwana-juku was located on the western banks of this river during the Edo period.

Geography 
The Ibi River has its source in Mount Kanmuri, which is located in the town of Ibigawa in Gifu Prefecture, and from there flows south. During its course, it temporarily merges with the Kiso and Nagara Rivers. In the city of Kuwana, Mie Prefecture, it finally joins with the Nagara River for good and continues flowing until Ise Bay.

River communities

Gifu Prefecture
Anpachi, Gōdo, Ibigawa, Ikeda, Kaizu, Mizunami, Ōno, Ōgaki, Wanouchi, Yōrō

Mie Prefecture
Kuwana

Additional notes 
 Every year, on the second Sunday of November, there is a marathon in Ibigawa, which goes along the river's shores.
 Kuwana is considered the meeting point between Kansai dialect and Nagoya dialect.

References

External links 
 (confluence with Nagara River)

Rivers of Mie Prefecture
Rivers of Gifu Prefecture
Rivers of Japan